Kupeharpalus is a genus of beetles in the family Carabidae, containing the following species:

 Kupeharpalus barrattae Larochelle & Lariviere, 2005
 Kupeharpalus embersoni Larochelle & Lariviere, 2005
 Kupeharpalus johnsi Larochelle & Lariviere, 2005

References

Harpalinae